In mathematics, a Kac–Moody algebra (named for Victor Kac and Robert Moody, who independently and simultaneously discovered them in 1968) is a Lie algebra, usually infinite-dimensional, that can be defined by generators and relations through a generalized Cartan matrix. These algebras form a generalization of finite-dimensional semisimple Lie algebras, and many properties related to the structure of a Lie algebra such as its root system, irreducible representations, and connection to flag manifolds have natural analogues in the Kac–Moody setting.

A class of Kac–Moody algebras called affine Lie algebras is of particular importance in mathematics and theoretical physics, especially two-dimensional conformal field theory and the theory of exactly solvable models. Kac discovered an elegant proof of certain combinatorial identities, the Macdonald identities, which is based on the representation theory of affine Kac–Moody algebras. Howard Garland and James Lepowsky demonstrated that Rogers–Ramanujan identities can be derived in a similar fashion.

History of Kac–Moody algebras 
The initial construction by Élie Cartan and Wilhelm Killing of finite dimensional simple Lie algebras from the Cartan integers was type dependent. In 1966 Jean-Pierre Serre showed that relations of Claude Chevalley and Harish-Chandra, with simplifications  by Nathan Jacobson, give a defining presentation for the Lie algebra. One could thus describe a simple Lie algebra in terms of generators and relations using data from the matrix of Cartan integers, which is naturally positive definite.

"Almost simultaneously in 1967, Victor Kac in the USSR and Robert Moody in Canada developed what was to become Kac–Moody algebra. Kac and Moody noticed that if Wilhelm Killing's conditions were relaxed, it was still possible to associate to the Cartan matrix a Lie algebra which, necessarily, would be infinite dimensional." – A. J. Coleman

In his 1967 thesis, Robert Moody considered Lie algebras whose Cartan matrix is no longer positive definite. This still gave rise to a Lie algebra, but one which is now infinite dimensional. Simultaneously, Z-graded Lie algebras were being studied in Moscow where I. L. Kantor introduced and studied a general class of Lie algebras including what eventually became known as Kac–Moody algebras. Victor Kac was also studying simple or nearly simple Lie algebras with polynomial growth. A rich mathematical theory of infinite dimensional Lie algebras evolved. An account of the subject, which also includes works of many others is given in (Kac 1990). See also (Seligman 1987).

Introduction 
 for all ;
;
;
, where  is the Kronecker delta;

Under a "symmetrizability" assumption,  identifies with the derived subalgebra  of the affine Kac-Moody algebra  defined below.

Definition 
Assume we are given an  generalized Cartan matrix  of rank r.

 The vector space  has dimension 2n − r 
 For every .  

, where  is the Kronecker delta;

A real (possibly infinite-dimensional) Lie algebra is also considered a Kac–Moody algebra if its complexification is a Kac–Moody algebra.

Root-space decomposition of a Kac–Moody algebra
 is the analogue of a Cartan subalgebra for the Kac–Moody algebra .

If  is an element of  such that

(The zero functional is not considered a root by convention.)

.

,

Types of Kac–Moody algebras
Properties of a Kac–Moody algebra are controlled by the algebraic properties of its generalized Cartan matrix C. In order to classify Kac–Moody algebras, it is enough to consider the case of an indecomposable matrix C, that is, assume that there is no decomposition of the set of indices I into a disjoint union of non-empty subsets I1 and I2 such that Cij = 0 for all i in I1 and j in I2. Any decomposition of the generalized Cartan matrix leads to the direct sum decomposition of the corresponding Kac–Moody algebra:

 

where the two Kac–Moody algebras in the right hand side are associated with the submatrices of C corresponding to the index sets I1 and I2.

An important subclass of Kac–Moody algebras corresponds to symmetrizable generalized Cartan matrices C, which can be decomposed as DS, where D is a diagonal matrix with positive integer entries and S is a symmetric matrix. Under the assumptions that C is symmetrizable and indecomposable, the Kac–Moody algebras are divided into three classes:

A positive definite matrix S gives rise to a finite-dimensional simple Lie algebra.
A positive semidefinite matrix S gives rise to an infinite-dimensional Kac–Moody algebra of affine type, or an affine Lie algebra.
An indefinite matrix S gives rise to a Kac–Moody algebra of indefinite type.
Since the diagonal entries of C and S are positive, S cannot be negative definite or negative semidefinite.

Symmetrizable indecomposable generalized Cartan matrices of finite and affine type have been completely classified. They correspond to Dynkin diagrams and affine Dynkin diagrams. Little is known about the Kac–Moody algebras of indefinite type, although the groups corresponding to these Kac–Moody algebras were constructed over arbitrary fields by Jacques Tits.

Among the Kac–Moody algebras of indefinite type, most work has focused on those hyperbolic type, for which the matrix S is indefinite, but for each proper subset of I, the corresponding submatrix is positive definite or positive semidefinite.  Hyperbolic Kac–Moody algebras have rank at most 10, and they have been completely classified.  There are infinitely many of rank 2, and 238 of ranks between 3 and 10.

See also
Weyl–Kac character formula
Generalized Kac–Moody algebra
Integrable module
Monstrous moonshine

Citations

References

Robert V. Moody, A new class of Lie algebras, Journal of Algebra, 10 (1968), 211–230.  
Victor Kac, Infinite dimensional Lie algebras, 3rd edition, Cambridge University Press (1990)  
Antony Wassermann, Lecture notes on Kac–Moody and Virasoro algebras

 Victor G. Kac, Simple irreducible graded Lie algebras of finite growth Math. USSR Izv., 2 (1968) pp. 1271–1311, Izv. Akad. Nauk USSR Ser. Mat., 32 (1968) pp. 1923–1967

Shrawan Kumar, Kac–Moody Groups, their Flag Varieties and Representation Theory, 1st edition, Birkhäuser (2002). .

External links
 SIGMA: Special Issue on Kac–Moody Algebras and Applications

Lie algebras
Moonshine theory